Chris Miller (born May 5, 1989) is an American racing driver from Minneapolis, Minnesota. He is best known for winning in class at the 2016 24 Hours of Daytona and winning overall at the 2018 6 Hours of Watkins Glen. He currently competes in the WeatherTech SportsCar Championship with JDC-Miller MotorSports.

In 2008 he drove in the F2000 Championship Series for JDC MotorSports and finished 4th in points. He won the 2009 F2000 Championship Series title, winning 4 of the 12 races. In 2010 he moved up to the Pro Mazda championship.

In 2014 Miller and JDC-Miller MotorSports entered the Tudor United SportsCar Championship, finishing fourth in their series debut at the 12 Hours of Sebring. Miller finished 7th in the championship and claimed the team's first podium at Road America. In 2015 he finished third at the Rolex 24.

In 2016 Miller and JDC-Miller MotorSports won in class at the Rolex 24 Hours of Daytona. He also scored a podium that year at Petit Le Mans, helping the team to finish third in the championship. 

In 2017 Miller and JDC-Miller MotorSports moved to the Prototype class and scored a second place podium finish at the 6 Hours of Watkins Glen. Their success led to sponsorship from GAINSCO/Bob Stallings Racing for the 2018 season and the return of the no. 99 Red Dragon. Miller went on to win that year's 6 Hours of Watkins Glen with Misha Goikhberg and Stephen Simpson, the first Prototype and overall victory for JDC-Miller MotorSports. 

In 2019 Miller drove a Cadillac DPi-V.R for JDC-Miller MotorSports in the Michelin Endurance Cup.

Motorsports career results

American open–wheel racing
(key) (Races in bold indicate pole position; races in italics indicate fastest lap)

F2000 Championship Series

Star Mazda Championship

{| class="wikitable" style="text-align:center; font-size:90%"
! Year
! Team
! 1
! 2
! 3
! 4
! 5
! 6
! 7
! 8
! 9
! 10
! 11
! 12
! 13
! Rank
! Points
|-
| 2009
! JDC MotorSports
| SEB
| VIR
| MMP
| NJ1
| NJ2
| WIS
| IOW
| ILL
| ILL| QUE
| ONT
|style="background:#EFCFFF;"| ATL
|style="background:#CFCFFF;"| LAG
! -
! 0
|-
| 2010
! JDC MotorSports
|style="background:#CFEAFF;"| SEB
|style="background:#CFCFFF;"| STP
|style="background:#CFEAFF;"| LAG
|style="background:#EFCFFF;"| ORP
|style="background:#EFCFFF;"| IOW
|style="background:#CFEAFF;"| NJ1
|style="background:#CFCFFF;"| NJ2
|style="background:#EFCFFF;"| ACC
|style="background:#CFCFFF;"| ACC
|style="background:#CFCFFF;"| TRO
|style="background:#EFCFFF;"| ROA
|style="background:#CFEAFF;"| MOS
|style="background:#CFEAFF;"| ATL
!style="background:#CFCFFF;"| 11th
!style="background:#CFCFFF;"| 313
|-
| 2011
! JDC MotorSports
|style="background:#DFFFDF;"| STP
| BAR
| IND
| MIL
| IOW
|style="background:#CFEAFF;"| MOS
| TRO
| TRO
| SON
| BAL
| LAG
|
|
!style="background:#CFCFFF;"| 17th
!style="background:#CFCFFF;"| 61
|}

Complete WeatherTech SportsCar Championship results
(key) (Races in bold indicate pole position) (Races in italics'' indicate fastest lap)

References

External links

 JDC-Miller Motorsports
 Racing-Reference Chris Miller
 Driver Database Chris Miller

1989 births
Living people
24 Hours of Daytona drivers
Indy Pro 2000 Championship drivers
WeatherTech SportsCar Championship drivers
JDC Motorsports drivers
Michelin Pilot Challenge drivers